Akritogyra helicella is a species of sea snail, a marine gastropod mollusk, unassigned in the superfamily Seguenzioidea.

Description

Distribution
This species occurs in the Atlantic ocean off Iceland.

References

helicella
Gastropods described in 1993